Wim Bronger ( – ) was a Dutch footballer.

Club career
Bronger was one of only five VOC players to play for the national team.

International career
He was part of the Netherlands national football team, playing 1 match on 10 March 1912 against Belgium.

See also
 List of Dutch international footballers

References

External links
 

1888 births
1965 deaths
Footballers from Rotterdam
Association football defenders
Dutch footballers
Netherlands international footballers